Xue Zizheng (1905 - 1980) was a Chinese politician who served as deputy head of the United Front Work Department of the Central Committee of the Communist Party of China (CPC) between 1958 and 1966.

Biography
Xue was born in Lirang Town of Liangshan County in Sichuan Province of China in 1905, which was during the Qing Dynasty. In his early years, he studied at school in Wuchang and Nanjing. He is a graduate of Shanghai University, Communist University of the Toilers of the East, and Lenin Military-Political Academy. 

In 1926, Xue joined the Communist Party of China. He took part in the Third Rebellion of Shanghai Workers. Xue worked in Eastern Jiangxi Communist-controlled China in 1930, then worked in Minbei Communist-controlled China, he was transferred to Jiangxi Military District in 1934.

After 1949, Xue served as the deputy mayor of Beijing, the vice chairman of State Economic and Trade Commission, the deputy head of the United Front Work Department of the CPC Central Committee, the deputy secretary general of the Chinese People's Political Consultative Conference, Members Member of the Central Commission for Discipline Inspection of the Communist Party of China.

In July 1980, Xue died in Beijing.

Personal life
Xue has an adopted son named Charles Xue who acquired American citizenship.

References

1905 births
People from Liangping County, Chongqing
People's Republic of China politicians from Chongqing
Shanghai University alumni
Communist University of the Toilers of the East alumni
1980 deaths
Chinese expatriates in the Soviet Union
Lenin Military Political Academy alumni